Capital punishment is a legal penalty in Uganda. It last executed in 2005. However, the country is considered "Retentionist" due to a lack of "an established practice or policy against carrying out executions."  

In 2019, the Parliament of Uganda abolished the mandatory death penalty.

References

Uganda
Law of Uganda